Danapur is an Indian satellite town and one of the 6 sub-divisions (Tehsil) in Patna district of Bihar state. The population was 182,241 at the 2011 India Census. It is part of the Patna Metropolitan Region. It was constituted as a municipality in 1887.
Danapur is also a shelter and hatchery for the migrating Siberian cranes, locally called Janhgil. They visit every year during the monsoon season for breeding and leave this place before the start of the winter season. The Sub-Area Headquarters of Bihar and Jharkhand is situated in the army cantonment here. Nagar Parishad Danapur Nizamat looks after municipal works of Danapur area. 

In 2018, Bihar State Road Development Corporation Limited (BSRDCL) completed the construction work of a ten- metre-wide 10.6 km long road along the western embankment of Digha-Danapur canal. This road also passes underneath the 12.27 km long Digha-AIIMS elevated road (Patli Path) that connects NH-98 near AIIMS Patna to Digha on the Loknayak Ganga Path (or Patna Marine Drive) at Patna.

Flagstaff ghat on the Ganges at Dinapur, Patna, 1859 is one of the oldest ghats. Gurdwara Handi Sahib,a gurdwara of Guru Tegh Bahadur, is a pilgrimage place for Sikhs. Naulakha temple and various historical buildings of British rule are places of interest.

Geography
Danapur is located on the bank of the River Ganges.

According to the City development plan for Danapur, the city has a total area of 11.63 km2 and is divided into 40 wards. The Nagar Parishad Danapur Nizamat (Municipal Council) was established in 1889.

Demographics

As of the census of 2011, there were 182,241 with 97,129 	men and 85,112 women residing in the city. Out of which 25,092 (13.77%) had children under the age of 6. There were 13,398 boys while 11,694 are girls. The population density as per 2001 data is about 113 persons/ha. The overall literacy rate is 78.4%, with the male literacy rate being 84.54% and the female literacy rate being 71.39%. The sex ratio of 882 per 1000 males was lower than the national average of 944. And child sex ratio of girls is 873 per 1000 boys.

Politics

Danapur is part of Danapur Assembly constituency under the Pataliputra Lok Sabha constituency.

Administration
The Danapur sub-division (Tehsil) is headed by an IAS or State Civil Service Officer of the rank of Sub Divisional Magistrate (SDM).

Blocks
The Danapur Tehsil is divided into 4 Blocks, each headed by a Block Development Officer (BDO).

List of Blocks is as follows:
 Danapur
 Maner
 Bihta
 Naubatpur

List of villages
The list of villages in Danapur-cum-Khagaul Block (under Danapur Tehsil) is as follows:
 Ganghara
 Hathia Kandh
 Hetanpur
 Jamaluddin
 Jamsaut
 Kasim Chak
 Kothawan
 Lakhani Bigha
 Manas
 Mobarakpur-Raghurampur
 Patlapur
 Purani Panapur
 Sarari

See also

Khagaul
Danapur Cantt
Digha-Danapur canal (Patna canal)
Bihta
Patna
Maner Sharif

References

External links
Official website of Patna
MLA Danapur Asha Sinha 

Cities and towns in Patna district
Neighbourhoods in Patna
1887 establishments in India